WHCR-LP (105.3 FM) was a radio station licensed to Hobgood, North Carolina, United States.  The station was owned by the Town of Hobgood. Its license was cancelled August 24, 2011.

References

HCR-LP
HCR-LP
Radio stations established in 2005
2005 establishments in North Carolina
Radio stations disestablished in 2011
2011 disestablishments in North Carolina
Defunct community radio stations in the United States